Gyromitra anthracobia is a post-fire ascomycete fungus in the family Discinaceae. It was described as new to science in 2018 from recently burned forests on the island of Cyprus.

This fungus can resemble a Verpa species in the field because of its smooth, hollow and distinctly elongated stipe, which is attached to the pileus only at the apex. Its cerebriform (brain-like) pileus, brown-pigmented paraphyses and biguttulate cyanophilic spores, are all typical gyromitroid features, however. 

Because of its carbonicolous ecology and isolated phylogenetic position within Gyromitra, G. anthracobia was placed in the new subgenus Pseudoverpa by Crous and colleagues (2018).

References

Fungi described in 2018

Discinaceae
Fungi of Europe